Marco Charles Tongue (born April 6, 1960 in Annapolis, Maryland) is a former professional American football defensive back in the National Football League. He played two seasons for the Baltimore Colts (1983) and the Buffalo Bills (1984).

External links
Pro-Football-Reference

1960 births
Living people
Sportspeople from Annapolis, Maryland
Players of American football from Maryland
American football defensive backs
Bowie State Bulldogs football players
Baltimore Colts players
Buffalo Bills players